Silent City is the nickname for the Maltese city of Mdina.

Silent City may also refer to:

Silent City, a 2012 film by Threes Anna
Silent City (album), a 2008 album by Brooklyn Rider
 Silent City (Punjab), model graveyards in Pakistan
The Silent City, a 2007 EP by Hope Lies Within
Le Silence de la Cité (The Silent City), a 1981 novel by Élisabeth Vonarburg